Chakhmaq (also Romanized as Chakhmāq) is a village in Aland Rural District, Safayyeh District, Khoy County, West Azerbaijan Province, Iran. At the 2006 census, its population consisted of 54 families with 285 people.

References 

Populated places in Khoy County